Si Mueang Mai is a district (Amphoe) in the northeastern part of Ubon Ratchathani province, northeastern Thailand; it may also be spelled Sri Mueang Mai.

History
Historically, the area was Khwaeng Mueang Khong Chiam. The head of the khwaeng was Upahad (อุปฮาด), who reported to the governor of Ubon Ratchathani. In 1903 the office of Khong Chiam was moved from Ban Na Kho to Ban Na Pho Klang.

In 1912 the office of Khwaeng Mueang Khong Chiam Tai was moved to Ban Na Ueat, Tambon Na Kham. In 1914 was moved again to Ban Dan Pak Mun, Tambon Suwan Wari Noi, and subsequently the district was renamed "Suwan Warin". In 1939 it got back its historical name Khong Chiam. Finally the district office was moved to Rong Kham Ma Chok in 1957.

On 14 September 1971 the Khong Chiam was renamed "Si Mueang Mai". At the same time the district Ban Dan, split off from Khong Chiam in 1959, received the name Khong Chiam, as it contained the central part of the historical mueang.

Geography
Neighboring districts are (from the southeast clockwise) Khong Chiam, Phibun Mangsahan, Tan Sum, Trakan Phuet Phon, and Pho Sai. To the east across the Mekong river is the Laotian province of Salavan.

The important water resource is the Mekong River.

Administration
The district is divided into 11 sub-districts (tambon), which are further subdivided into 118 villages (muban). Si Mueang Mai is the only township (thesaban tambon) of the district, covering parts of the tambon Na Kham. There are a further 11 tambon administrative organizations (TAO).

References

External links
amphoe.com

Si Mueang Mai